Katherine Howell is an Australian crime writer best known for her series featuring Sydney police detective Ella Marconi. A notable feature of her work is the use of paramedics as protagonists. Howell worked as a paramedic for fifteen years and draws on that experience in her books, which are published in multiple countries and languages. Howell holds BA and master's degrees in writing and teaches workshops in writing, editing, and suspense (the subject of her Masters thesis).

Awards
2008 - Davitt award for best adult crime novel, for her debut novel Frantic.
2009 - Davitt reader's choice award for The Darkest Hour.
2011 - Davitt best adult novel award for Cold Justice (first author to win this category twice).

Bibliography
 Frantic (2007)
 The Darkest Hour (2008)
 Cold Justice (2010)
 Violent Exposure (2010)
 Silent Fear (2012)
 Web Of Deceit (2013)
 Deserving Death (2014)
 Tell the Truth (2015)
 Web of Deceit (2015)

References

External links 
 
Sirens fade but the fear lingers July 2007 interview in the Sydney Morning Herald
Aust Crime Fiction
Pan MacMillan
The Australian
ABC Radio National
The Age
The Writing Bar Interview

Australian crime writers
Living people
Year of birth missing (living people)
Place of birth missing (living people)